Northern Cyprus is recognised only by Turkey, a country which facilitates many of its contacts with the international community. After it was occupied by Turkey, Northern Cyprus' relations with the rest of the world were further complicated by a series of United Nations resolutions which declared its independence legally invalid. A 2004 UN Referendum on settling the Cyprus dispute was accepted by the Turkish Cypriots but rejected by the Greek Cypriots. After that, the European Union declared its intentions to assist in reducing the economic isolation of Northern Cyprus and began giving aid to the territory. However, due to pressure from Greece and the Republic of Cyprus, this aid coming from EU funds cannot be used on Greek Cypriot land and property nor on public bodies. As a result, these funds can be used only on 29 percent of people on the island of Cyprus (those under the de facto control of Northern Cyprus).

There is an embargo against the entity in many areas, decisively affecting its attempts at international contacts and representation.

International recognition
At present Turkey is the only country which recognises Northern Cyprus.

In 1983 Bangladesh and Pakistan withdrew recognition after UNSC Resolution 541 amid international pressure.

In 2005, Yahya Jammeh, then President of the Gambia,  said that his country was ready to recognise the independence of Northern Cyprus. The Cypriot government protested and the Gambia did not recognise the TRNC.

The Nakhichivan Autonomous Republic (an exclave of Azerbaijan) had issued a resolution in the mid-1990s recognising the TRNC's independence, but Azerbaijan itself has yet refrained to officially support this decision due to the Nagorno-Karabakh issue. Azerbaijan is sympathetic to the TRNC, but the Republic of Cyprus could recognise Nagorno-Karabakh if Azerbaijan officially recognised the TRNC. Lately high level contacts between Azerbaijan and Northern Cyprus have increased. Faiz Sucuoğlu, TRNC's Prime Minister at the time expressed his hope in 2022 that Azerbaijan would recognise his country.

TRNC Foreign Minister Tahsin Ertuğruloğlu made a call to the members of OIC on September 23, 2022, at a coordination meeting of the Organization's ministers of foreign affairs, at New York, to recognize his country, only a couple of days after a similar call by the President of Turkey to the international community at the 77th UNGA.

Diplomatic representations

Since the establishment of the TRNC in 1983, only Turkey maintains a resident embassy in Northern Cyprus, and opened a Consulate General in Famagusta in mid January 2023. The TRNC has an embassy in Ankara and consulates in several major cities of Turkey.

In various other countries, the TRNC has representative offices, some of which are unofficial. Turkey represents the TRNC's interests in countries without such offices. In North Nicosia (the Turkish Cypriot administered northern half), both the British High Commissioner to Cyprus and the United States Ambassador to Cyprus have their formal residences, though since these residences had been in use since before 1963, it is not indicative of formal recognition of the TRNC by the United Kingdom or United States. In the same situation are the representative offices maintained by Australia, France, Germany, South Korea.

In May 2015, the EU Infopoint office that aims to bring the Turkish Cypriots closer to the EU, has been inaugurated in North Nicosia.

Honorary Representatives are also appointed by the TRNC in various other cities to represent the TRNC and to assist the primary TRNC Representative Offices.

United States, United Kingdom and Australia have representation offices in Northern Nicosia. As well, Northern Cyprus has a number of representations in other countries with various status.

Foreign Minister
The current Foreign Minister, since December 2020, is Tahsin Ertuğruloğlu.

Bilateral relations

Azerbaijan
On 9 August 2022, Azerbaijan's president received TRNC President Ersin Tatar in Konya and regarded Northern Cyprus officially as the "Turkish Republic of Northern Cyprus".

Cyprus
There are nine border crossings between Northern Cyprus and the Republic of Cyprus. Since May 2004 some tourists have taken to flying to the Republic of Cyprus directly then crossing the green line to vacation in Northern Cyprus.

The internationally recognised government of the Republic of Cyprus refuses to give any official status to the government of the TRNC, and actively dissuades any other country from doing so. This policy is in line with the United Nations Security Council resolutions and the policy of the entire international community which refuses to recognise the TRNC. The government of the Republic of Cyprus regards the TRNC in such terms as "illegitimate entity", "Turkish military occupied territory" and "a puppet state of Turkey".  Phraseology such as "pseudo" or "so-called" are used by the Cyprus Government to describe government officials and institutions in the TRNC.

The TRNC President is referred to simply as the "Turkish Cypriot Leader" by the Cyprus Government, the EU and the United Nations. It is however interesting to note that under the 1960 Constitution of Cyprus, the Leader of the Turkish Cypriots is regarded as the Vice-President of the Republic of Cyprus with wide veto powers, but this status has not been acknowledged by the government of the Republic of Cyprus since December 1963. Due to this stance, the TRNC refuses any official recognition of the government of the Republic of Cyprus, calling it the "Greek Cypriot Administration of Southern Cyprus", and referring to its President as the "Greek Cypriot Leader".  Turkey backs this position.

After the Republic of Cyprus became a member of the European Union, the southern part of the island became part of the Customs Union of the EU. The Northern part of the island is excluded from the Customs Union. In spite of that, the Green Line regulations are intended to ease trade relations between North Cyprus and the EU.

Oil exploration in East Mediterranean became a problem between the administrations of the north and the south side since 2000. The EU member Greece supports the south whereas EU-candidate Turkey supports the north.

Equatorial Guinea
In 2011 and 2012, president of Northern Cyprus Dervis Eroglu and president of Equatorial Guinea Teodoro Obiang Nguema Mbasogo held a meeting in New York, US.

Gambia
On 30.11.2022, the President of Northern Cyprus, Ersin Tatar, received the Vice President of the Republic of The Gambia, Badara Alieu Joof, who invited President Tatar to The Gambia.

Greece
In 2014, the-then Turkish Cypriot negotiator Kudret Ozersay and his delegation was received by the Secretary General of the Greek Foreign Ministry, Anastasios Mitsialis.

Guinea
In 2008, the minister of Economy, Finance and Planning of Guinea, Ousmane Doré, visited Northern Cyprus and met with Turgay Avci, the minister of Foreign Affairs of Northern Cyprus.

Kosovo
On 18 February 2008, the President of the TRNC, Mehmet Ali Talat, congratulated the people of Kosovo on their new-found independence, in direct opposition to the Republic of Cyprus, which rejects Kosovo's declaration of independence, but not Turkey, which was the fifth country to recognise Kosovo. However, presidential spokesman Hasan Ercakica stated that the TRNC was not preparing to officially recognise Kosovo. In contrast, the Republic of Cyprus has rejected Kosovo's declaration of independence and, given the ICJ ruling that Kosovo's declaration of independence was not illegal, stated that Kosovo and Northern Cyprus were not analogous situations. Some analysts have argued that the independence of Kosovo could provide support for the recognition of Northern Cyprus.

Kyrgyzstan
In 2008 Kyrgyzstan earthquake, Northern Cyprus helped Kyrgyzstan and granted tents, blankets, tons of food, construction materials (cement, covering slate, timber and bricks), power generators, wood stoves, and warm clothes. In 2016, a common Turkish Cypriot–Kyrgyz business cooperation forum was held in Kyrgyzstan.

Libya
On 30 October 2011, Libya and Northern Cyprus signed the Cooperation on Health Services Protocol. The protocol included to reserve 250 beds at the Near East University hospital in North Nicosia for the treatment of injured Libyans.

Pakistan
In February 2017, the president of Northern Cyprus, Mustafa Akinci was received by the president of Pakistan, Mamnoon Hussain.

Russia
In February 2008, Vladimir V. Putin, the President of the Russian Federation, equated the Northern Cyprus situation with that resulting from a unilateral Kosovo declaration of independence, which he opposes, in order to point of European countries double standards in their desire to recognise Kosovo region as an independent state.

On 2 September 2008, the Russian Ambassador to Turkey announced that if Turkey recognised the Georgian breakaway regions of South Ossetia and Abkhazia, Russia would recognise the TRNC as an independent country. Later, Russian Foreign Minister Sergei Lavrov rejected this variant.

Turkey

The TRNC fully supports Turkey's bid to join the European Union. As part of this bid, Turkey signed a protocol extending its customs union to the new EU members, including the Republic of Cyprus, which Turkey does not recognise. Turkey made sure this was not tantamount to recognition with the inclusion of a declaration, stipulating their continued policy of non-recognition of what they describe as the "Greek Cypriot administration of Southern Cyprus" until a settlement is reached.  This declaration is not accepted by the EU which did not accept this statement as forming part of the acquis and expects Turkey to fully abide to its obligations against the Republic of Cyprus. The TRNC views any move by the EU to force Turkish recognition of the Republic of Cyprus as an effort to cut them off from their base of support.

On 21 September 2011, Turkey and Northern Cyprus signed the EEZ border agreement in New York.

In January 2018, Turkish Cypriot Prime Minister Hüseyin Özgürgün voiced support for the Turkish invasion of northern Syria aimed at ousting U.S.-backed Syrian Kurds from the enclave of Afrin. Özgürgün said his greatest wish is the successful outcome of the Afrin operation.

United Kingdom

On 3 February 2017, UK's High Court ruled that "There was no duty in UK law upon the Government to refrain from recognising Northern Cyprus. The United Nations itself works with Northern Cyprus law enforcement agencies and facilitates co-operation between the two parts of the island." Turkish Cypriot governmental officials declared that Northern Cyprus must be ready to Brexit since EU acquis will not be binding on UK thereby UK and Northern Cyprus can trade just as pre-1994 ECtHR ruling.

United States

The United States abstained in a vote in 1984 in the UN Security Council condemning "secessionist activities" on Cyprus. Northern Cyprus Representative Office is located at 1667 K Street, Northwest in Washington, D.C. The Representative Office in New York City is the de facto mission of the TRNC to the United Nations Organisation (as well as a de facto Consulate-General).

Membership in international organisations
In 1979, Northern Cyprus became an observer member of the Organisation of Islamic Cooperation under the title "Turkish Cypriot State". In 2017, Northern Cyprus was represented with its official name "Turkish Republic of Northern Cyprus" for the first time at an OIC conference in Saudi Arabia.

In 1994, the Turkish Republic of Northern Cyprus became an observer member of the International Organization of Turkic Culture (Türksoy).

In 2004, the Turkish Cypriot community was awarded "observer status" in the Parliamentary Assembly of the Council of Europe (PACE), as part of the Cypriot delegation. Since then, the two Turkish Cypriot representatives of PACE are elected in the Assembly of Northern Cyprus.

On 16 October 2012, Northern Cyprus became an observer member of the Economic Cooperation Organization under the title "Turkish Cypriot State". In 2017, Northern Cyprus was represented with its official name "Turkish Republic of Northern Cyprus" for the first time at an ECO conference in Pakistan.

In 2013, North Cyprus Red Crescent Society became an observer member of the International Federation of Red Cross and Red Crescent Societies.

In 2022, Northern Cyprus became an observer member of the Organization of Turkic States with its official name "Turkish Republic of Northern Cyprus". The TRNC President, Ersin Tatar, participated at the Ankara Extraordinary Summit of the Organization on 17 March 2023.

In 2023, Northern Cyprus participated to the 146th Inter-Parliamentary Union (IPU) summit in Bahrain.

See also
 List of diplomatic missions in Northern Cyprus
 List of diplomatic missions of Northern Cyprus
 Turkish Cypriot diaspora
 ELF Cup

References

External links
 
 President's Office, Turkish Republic Of Northern Cyprus
 Turkish Republic Of Northern Cyprus Ministry of Foreign Affairs
 Turkish Republic Of Northern Cyprus Public Information Office
 "REGNUM" analysis on the international recognition situation of the TRNC